This list is of the Places of Scenic Beauty of Japan located within the Prefecture of Okayama.

National Places of Scenic Beauty
As of 1 December 2022, twelve Places have been designated at a national level (including one *Special Place of Scenic Beauty).

Prefectural Places of Scenic Beauty
As of 1 May 2022, six Places have been designated at a prefectural level.

Municipal Places of Scenic Beauty
As of 1 May 2022, thirty-six Places have been designated at a municipal level.

Registered Places of Scenic Beauty
As of 1 December 2022, one Monument has been registered (as opposed to designated) as a Place of Scenic Beauty at a national level.

See also
 Cultural Properties of Japan
 List of parks and gardens of Okayama Prefecture
 List of Historic Sites of Japan (Okayama)
 List of Cultural Properties of Japan - paintings (Okayama)

References

External links
  Cultural Properties in Okayama Prefecture

Tourist attractions in Okayama Prefecture
Places of Scenic Beauty

ja:Category:岡山県にある国指定の名勝